The Modern Library Chronicles are a series of short books published by the American publisher, Modern Library. Most of the books are under 150 pages in length and intended to introduce readers to a period of history.

A partial list includes:

The Renaissance, by Paul Johnson
Islam: A Short History, by Karen Armstrong
The Balkans, by Mark Mazower
The German Empire: 1870-1918, by Michael Stürmer
 , by Hans Küng
Peoples and Empires, by Anthony Pagden
Communism, by Richard Pipes
Hitler and the Holocaust, by Robert S. Wistrich
The American Revolution, by Gordon S. Wood
Law in America, by Lawrence Friedman
Inventing Japan: 1853-1964, by Ian Buruma
The Company: A Short History of a Revolutionary Idea, by John Micklethwait and Adrian Wooldridge
The Americas: A Hemispheric History, by Felipe Fernandez-Armesto
The Boys' Crusade, by Paul Fussell
The Age of Shakespeare, by Frank Kermode
The Age of Napoleon, by Alistair Horne
Evolution: The Remarkable History of a Scientific Theory, by Edward J. Larson
London: A History, by A.N. Wilson
The Reformation: A History, by Patrick Collinson
Nazism and War, by Richard Bessel
The City, by Joel Kotkin
Infinite Ascent: A Short History of Mathematics, by David Berlinski
California: A History, by Kevin Starr
Storm from the East: The Struggle Between the Arab World and the Christian West, by Milton Viorst
Baseball: A History of America's Favorite Game, by George Vecsey
Nonviolence: Twenty-five Lessons from the History of a Dangerous Idea by Mark Kurlansky
The Hellenistic Age: A Short History, by Peter Green
A Short History of Medicine, by F. Gonzalez-Crussi
The Christian World, by Martin Marty
Prehistory, by Colin Renfrew
Dangerous Games: The Uses and Abuses of History, by Margaret MacMillan
Uncivil Society: 1989 and the Implosion of the Communist Establishment, by Stephen Kotkin
The Korean War: A History, by Bruce Cummings
The Romantic Revolution: A History, by Tim Blanning

References

Series of books
Series of history books